The Accademia della Crusca ("Academy of the Bran"), generally abbreviated as La Crusca, is a Florence-based society of scholars of Italian linguistics and philology. It is one of the most important research institutions of the Italian language, as well as the oldest linguistic academy in the world.

The Accademia was founded in Florence in 1583, and has since been characterized by its efforts to maintain the purity of the Italian language. , which means "bran" in Italian, helps convey the metaphor that its work is similar to winnowing, as also does its emblem depicting a sifter for straining out corrupt words and structures (as bran is separated from wheat). The academy motto is "Il più bel fior ne coglie" ('She gathers the fairest flower'), a famous line by the Italian poet Francesco Petrarca. In 1612, the Accademia published the first edition of its dictionary, the Vocabolario degli Accademici della Crusca, which has served as the model for similar works in French, Spanish, German and English.

The academy is a member of the European Federation of National Linguistic Institutes.

History

Origins 

The members usually assembled on pleasant and convivial occasions, during which —discourses in a merry and playful style, which have neither a beginning nor an end—were recited. The Crusconi used humour, satire, and irony to distance itself from the pedantry of the Accademia Fiorentina, protected by Grand Duke Cosimo I de' Medici, and to contrast itself with the severe and classic style of that body. This battle was fought without compromising the primary intention of the group, which was typically literary, and expounded in high-quality literary disputes.

The founders of the Accademia della Crusca are traditionally identified as Giovanni Battista Deti ('Sollo'), Antonio Francesco Grazzini ('Lasca'), Bernardo Canigiani ('Gramolato'), Bernardo Zanchini ('Macerato'), Bastiano de' Rossi ('Inferigno'); they were joined in October 1582 by Lionardo Salviati ('Infarinato') (1540–1589). Under his leadership, at the beginning of 1583, the Accademia took on a new form, directing itself to demonstrate and to conserve the beauty of the Florentine vulgar tongue, modelled upon the authors of the Trecento.

Monosini and the first Vocabolario 
One of the earliest scholars to influence the work of the Crusca was Agnolo Monosini. He contributed greatly to the 1612 edition of Vocabolario degli Accademici della Crusca, especially with regard to the influence of Greek, which, he maintained, made a significant contribution to the Fiorentine idiom of the period.

The Accademia thus abandoned the jocular character of its earlier meetings in order to take up the normative role it would assume from then on. The very title of the Accademia came to be interpreted in a new way: the academicians of the Crusca would now work to distinguish the good and pure part of the language (the farina, or whole wheat) from the bad and impure part (the crusca, or bran). From this is derived the symbolism of the Crusca: its logo shows a frullone or sifter with the Petrarchan motto Il più bel fior ne coglie (She gathers the fairest flower). The members of the Accademia were given nicknames associated with corn and flour, and seats in the form of breadbaskets with backs in the shape of bread shovel were used for their meetings.

In 1636, Cardinal Richelieu created the Académie française on the model of the Accademia della Crusca.

Beccaria and Verri opposition 
The linguistic purism of the Accademia found opposition in Cesare Beccaria and the Verri brothers (Pietro and Alessandro), who through their journal Il Caffè systematically attacked the Accademia's archaisms as pedantic, denouncing the Accademia while invoking for contrast no less than the likes of Galileo and Newton and even modern intellectual cosmopolitanism itself. However, since Galileo published his scientific works in his native Florentine Italian, as opposed to the Latin which was customary for academic works of the time, it has also been argued that he implicitly supported the Accademia's purpose.

Baroque period 
The Accademia's activities carried on with both high and low points until 1783, when Pietro Leopoldo quit and, with several other academicians, created the second Accademia Fiorentina. In 1808, however, the third Accademia Fiorentina was founded and, by a decree of 19 January 1811, signed by Napoleon, the Crusca was re-established with its own status of autonomy, statutes and previous aims.

In the 20th century, the decree of 11 March 1923 changed its composition and its purpose. The compilation of the Vocabolario, hitherto the duty of the Crusca, was removed from it and passed to a private society of scholars; the Crusca was entrusted with the compilation of philological texts. In 1955, however, Bruno Migliorini and others began discussion of the return of the work of preparing the  Vocabolario to the Crusca.

In recent years 

In 2007, the website E-leo compiling 3,000 drawings and writings of Leonardo da Vinci was launched, with the linguistic help of the Accademia della Crusca to decipher some of the inventor's scribblings.

In August 2011, the existence of the Accademia was threatened when Giulio Tremonti and Silvio Berlusconi introduced a proposition to eradicate all  public-funded entities with less than 70 members. In August 2015, the Accademia's website was defaced by a hacker linked to ISIS.

In February 2016,  the Accademia approved the submission of an 8-year old for a new Italian word, Petaloso (full of petals).

Composition

Members 
Members include:
   Nicoletta Maraschio (emerita), honorary president, Florence
   Lorenzo Renzi (emeritus), Padua
   Luca Serianni (emeritus), Rome
   Martin Maiden, Oxford

References

Further reading 
 Yates, Frances A. "The Italian Academies", in: Collected Essays; vol. II: Renaissance and Reform; the Italian Contribution, London, Routledge & Kegan Paul, 1983 
 Wiesner-Hanks, Merry E. Early Modern Europe, 1450–1789. Cambridge: Cambridge University Press, 2006

External links 

    The search for Some Historical References of Academy 
      Dictionary of Academy of Bran  the online version of editions 1612 through 1923 
    Academy of Bran and Some Historical References 
Accademia Della Crusca Collection From the Rare Book and Special Collections Division at the Library of Congress

Language regulators
Italian language
Cultural institutions of Tuscany
1583 establishments in Italy
Learned societies of Italy
Florence